Oggiona con Santo Stefano is a comune (municipality) in the Province of Varese in the Italian region Lombardy, located about  northwest of Milan and about  south of Varese.

Oggiona con Santo Stefano borders the following municipalities: Carnago, Cassano Magnago, Cavaria con Premezzo, Jerago con Orago, Solbiate Arno.

It is served by Cavaria-Oggiona-Jerago railway station.

Demographic evolution

References

Cities and towns in Lombardy